Claes-Göran Sture Granqvist (born 25 December 1946, Helsingborg, Sweden)  is a materials physicist and  Professor of Solid State Physics at Uppsala University in Sweden. 
Granqvist is considered a pioneer and expert in photochromic materials and energy-efficient building materials such as glass,  
paint, and wood.

Granqvist is a Fellow of SPIE, the international society for optics and photonics and a Member of the Royal Swedish Academy of Science and the Royal Swedish Academy of Engineering Sciences. He has served as Chairman of the Nobel Committee for Physics of the Royal Swedish Academy of Sciences.

Education
Granqvist received the PhD degree in physics at Chalmers University of Technology, Gothenburg, Sweden, in 1974.

Career
In 1975, Granqvist was a Postdoctoral associate at Cornell University, USA. In the period of 1976–89, he held various research positions at Chalmers University of Technology. 
From 1989–93 he was a Full Professor of Experimental Physics at Gothenburg University.
Since 1993, he is Full Professor of Solid State Physics and the Head of the Division of Solid State Physics at the Department of Engineering Sciences, The Ångström Laboratory, Uppsala University. In the period 1997–2006 he was the Vice Rector/Senior Advisor for External and International Affairs at Uppsala University.

Granqvist has been involved in the development of several technology companies, including Radicool and Coat AB (formed 1986). In May 2002, he and others at Uppsala University won the Venture Cup competition for best university spin-off business plan. This enabled Granqvist to found ChromoGenics in 2003 with Greger Gregard and other researchers. Granqvist continues to be a member of the board of the company.

Research 
Granqvist is a leading figure of Swedish and international science in various fields including nanomaterials; green nanotechnology; materials for solar energy utilization and energy efficiency (solar cells, solar collectors, energy efficient fenestration), electrochromic materials (smart windows); condensed matter physics; biomimetics; photocatalytic materials (air and water cleaning); materials for radiative cooling and superconductivity; fluctuation-enhanced sensing.

Granqvist introduced the term "smart window" in the 1980s, brainstorming ideas with scientists from Lawrence Berkeley National Laboratory in California to make building materials more energy efficient. Granqvist used the term to describe a responsive window capable of dynamically changing its tint.
After initially examining thermochromic, photochromic and electrochromic materials, he focused on electrochromic materials.
He has developed electrochromic glass for ‘‘intelligent windows’’ by using coatings of tungsten-doped vanadium dioxide to detect and change with environmental conditions. 

Granqvist's work as both a researcher and teacher has significantly driven Sweden's development of electrochromic materials.
As of 2021, Granqvist has an h-index of 70 and has been cited at least 28,400 times for 600 papers. 
He had published at  research papers in mostly refereed journals and over 30 books, and has given invited conference presentations at about 250 international conferences and chaired about 30 international meetings.

Honors
 2015, Czochralski Award, European Materials Research Society
 2011, Mentor Award, Society of Vacuum Coaters, "For his contributions to research and education in coating technologies that help enable displays, solar cells, and electrochromic windows."
 1998, Award, World Renewable Energy Congress
 1993, Member of the Royal Swedish Academy of Engineering Sciences (Kungliga Ingenjörsvetenskapsakademien).
 1989, Arnberg Prize (Arnbergska priset) of The Swedish Royal Academy of Sciences, Prize for best invention of the year (Sweden)
 Member of the Royal Swedish Academy of Sciences (Kungliga Vetenskapsakademien).
 Fellow of SPIE, the international society for optics and photonics.
 Member of the Regia Societas Scientarium Upsaliensis.
 Honorary Membership, Materials Research Society of India.
 Honorary Doctorate, Universidad Nacional Ingenieria, Lima, Peru.

Selected publications

Selected papers

Selected books

Author
  
 , reprinted 2002.

Editor
 
 
 
 , reprinted 2018.

References

1946 births
Living people
Chalmers University of Technology alumni
Swedish physicists
Swedish nanotechnologists
Academic staff of Uppsala University
Members of the Royal Swedish Academy of Sciences